Véronique Béliveau (born January 24, 1955), originally Nicole Monique, is a Canadian actress and pop/rock singer who was nominated for a 1987 Juno Award for Female Vocalist of the Year.  Her first full-length album was Prends-moi comme je suis in 1977. Her first English language album was Borderline in 1987, which was released under the single name Veronique. In 1985, she was one of a group of Canadian singers to make "Tears Are Not Enough" to raise funds to fight famine in Ethiopia. One of her high-profile performances was in the opening Gala for Expo 86.

Though mainly known as a singer, she was also an actress, appearing in the 1976 film Let's Talk About Love (Parlez-nous d'amour). Béliveau also appeared in a number of TV commercials for Simpsons.

Discography

Albums
1977 Prends-moi comme je suis (RCA)
1980 Veronique Beliveau (RCA)
1983 Transit (A & M)
1985 Cover Girl Cache Ton Coeur (A & M)
Under the name Veronique (no last name)
1987 Borderline ( A & M)
1989 Veronique

Singles
1977 "Nous Partirons En Univers" (RCA)
1980 "Aimer" (RCA) Quebec #1
1983 "Je Suis Fidele" (A & M)  Quebec #1
1983 "C'est Un Reveur" ( A& M) Quebec #1
1983 "That Boy" (A & M)
1984 "Please" (A & M)
1984 "Le Rock" (A & M)
1985 "Cover Girl(Cache Ton Coeur)" (A & M) Quebec #1
1985 "Je Suis Comme Je Suis" (A & M)
1985 "Toute La Nuit" (A & M)
Under the name Veronique (no last name)
1986 "Make A Move On Me" ( A & M) Canada #44
1987 "I Can't Help It" (A & M) Canada #85
1987 "Love You Like A Fire" (A & M)
1988 "Borderline" (A & M)
1989 "Jerusalem (A & M)" (duet with Marc Gabriel)
1989 "House of Love" (A & M) Canada #90
1990 "I'm Gonna Make You Love Me" (A & M)

Video clips
1985 Tears Are Not Enough (full-length documentary)
1986 Make A Move On Me
1987 I Can't Help It
1989 House Of Love

Other
With Northern Lights
1985 "Tears Are Not Enough"

Footnotes

Citations

References

[ Veronique Beliveau] at Allmusic.

External links
  Véronique Béliveau discography
 

1955 births
Living people
Actresses from Montreal
A&M Records artists
Canadian women pop singers
Canadian film actresses
French Quebecers
French-language singers of Canada
RCA Records artists
Singers from Montreal
20th-century Canadian women singers